Aliabad (also Romanized as ‘Alīābād) is a village in Bibalan Rural District, Kelachay District, Rudsar County, Gilan Province, Iran. At the 2006 census, its population was 324, in 83 families.

References 

Populated places in Rudsar County